Kovrov is a city in Vladimir Oblast, Russia, located on the right bank of the Klyazma River, a tributary of the Oka. Kovrov's population as of the 2021 Census was 132,417, down from 145,214 recorded in the 2010 Census, and further down from 155,499 recorded in the 2002 Census and 159,942 recorded in the 1989 Census. In terms of population, it is the second-largest city in Vladimir Oblast after Vladimir. In 1977, Kovrov's population had been estimated at 140,000.

History
Overshadowed by the neighboring Starodub-on-the-Klyazma since the 12th century, Kovrov was eventually granted town status in 1778. On July 13, 1978, the city's 200th anniversary, Kovrov was decorated with the Order of the Red Banner of Labor.

Administrative and municipal status
Within the framework of administrative divisions, Kovrov serves as the administrative center of Kovrovsky District, even though it is not a part of it. As an administrative division, it is incorporated separately as the City of Kovrov—an administrative unit with the status equal to that of the districts. As a municipal division, the City of Kovrov is incorporated as Kovrov Urban Okrug.

Economy
Kovrov is a major center of Russia's defense industry, specializing in mechanical engineering, metal processing, textile and light industry, and building industry. Kovrov is home to Degtyaryov plant, Kovrov Mechanical Factory, Kovrov Electromechanical Factory, and CB Armatura.

Transportation
Located on the Moscow–Nizhny Novgorod rail line—one of Russia's oldest railroads and one of the alternative routes of the Trans-Siberian Railway—Kovrov is also connected to Murom (which is served by the Moscow–Kazan rail line) by the Murom Railway.

International relations

Twin towns and sister cities
Kovrov is twinned with:
 Brest, Belarus
 Liberec, Czech Republic

References

Notes

Sources

External links
Official website of Kovrov 
Unofficial website of Kovrov 

Cities and towns in Vladimir Oblast
Kovrovsky Uyezd